Susan Harrison is a British actress, writer and character comedian, who trained at the Royal Scottish Academy of Music and Drama.  
She has taken two one woman shows "Five Characters In Search of Susan" and "Creatures" to the Edinburgh Fringe. "Creatures" was also the recipient of a ThreeWeeks Editor's Choice Award.

She was a Semi Finalist in the National Funny Women Awards, 2009.  
  
Susan tours the comedy circuit with characters including Mina the Horse (a horse who's had plastic surgery to become a unicorn), Shakira Evans (a reality star wannabe) and Jennie Benton-Smith (a teenage rapper from Tunbridge Wells).

References

Living people
British actresses
Year of birth missing (living people)